Daniella Rosas (born 21 January 2002) is a Peruvian surfer. She placed 4th overall at the 2021 ISA World Surfing Games, where she qualified for the 2020 Summer Olympics. She competed in the women's shortboard event, where she was eliminated in Round 2 of the event.

References

External links
 

Peruvian surfers
Living people
2002 births
Surfers at the 2020 Summer Olympics
Olympic surfers of Peru
World Surf League surfers
Pan American Games gold medalists for Peru
Pan American Games medalists in surfing
Surfers at the 2019 Pan American Games
Medalists at the 2019 Pan American Games
Sportspeople from Lima
21st-century Peruvian women